About Time 2 is the second album by British pop/dance act Clock. It was released in 1997 and features their hits "Oh What a Night" and "It's Over". The album peaked at number 56 on the UK Albums Chart.

Track listing
"Oh What a Night" – 3:28
"It's Over" – 3:23
"Whoomph! (There It Is!)" – 3:35
"Everybody" – 3:38
"You Get Me Love" (Rap Version) – 3:50
"Axel F" – 3:24
"Everybody Jump Around" – 3:19
"Fly Away" – 3:26
"C'Mon Everybody" – 3:13
"Don't Go Away" – 3:22
"September" – 3:40
"The Finest" – 4:19
"On the Beach" – 4:55
"Holding On 4 U" (Visa Radio Mix) – 3:51
"Gave You My Love" – 3:28
"The Lonely Snowman" – 3:51

References

External links
 About Time 2 at Discogs

1997 albums